
Gmina Zawonia is a rural gmina (administrative district) in Trzebnica County, Lower Silesian Voivodeship, in south-western Poland. It is part of the Wrocław metropolitan area.

Neighbouring gminas
Gmina Zawonia is bordered by the gminas of Długołęka, Dobroszyce, Krośnice, Milicz and Trzebnica.

Villages
The gmina contains the villages of Budczyce, Cielętniki, Czachowo, Czeszów, Głuchów Dolny, Grochowa, Kałowice, Kopiec, Ludgierzowice, Miłonowice, Niedary, Pęciszów, Pomianowice, Prawocice, Pstrzejowice, Radłów, Rzędziszowice, Sędzice, Skotniki, Stanięcice, Sucha Mała, Sucha Wielka, Tarnowiec, Trzemsze, Trzęsowice, Zawonia, Złotów and Złotówek.

References

Zawonia
Trzebnica County